Elijah Spira (1660–1712) (alternatively, "Shapira" or "Shapiro", Hebrew: אליהו שפירא) was son of Benjamin Wolf Spira. He was a brother-in-law of Rabbi Yaakov Reischer, Rabbi David Oppenheim and a student of Rabbi Avraham Gombiner. He was rabbi at Tiktin, and afterward preacher and director of a large Talmudic academy in his hometown of Prague. He died at Prague April 14, 1712.

His works include Eliyahu Zutta, a commentary on that part of Mordecai Yoffe's Levush relating to the Shulhan Arukh, Orach Chaim (Prague, 1689, 1701).

His best-known work was Eliyahu Rabbah (Sulzbach, 1757), containing discussions on Orach Chaim. It was printed posthumously by his son, whose name is not given. Originally intended as a commentary on the Levush (like Eliyahu Zutta), it was printed as commentary on the Shulchan Aruch and became known as such.

Shishah Shittot, containing novellæ on six Talmudic tractates, was published by his grandson Elijah ben Wolf Spira (Fürth, 1768). His manuscript works, including commentaries on the Bible and Talmud, as well as sermons, responsa, etc., were destroyed by fire in 1754.

References

 Its bibliography:
Eliyahu Rabbah, Preface;
Fürst, Bibl. Jud. i. 239 (contains many incorrect statements);
Zunz, Monatstage, p. 19.

1660 births
1712 deaths
Czech Orthodox rabbis
17th-century Polish rabbis
Austrian Orthodox rabbis
Rabbis of Prague
18th-century Bohemian rabbis
Authors of books on Jewish law